Voyages Indigenous Tourism Australia Pty Limited, commonly called Voyages, is a subsidiary business of the Indigenous Land Corporation. Voyages manages tourism and resort facilities in the Northern Territory, in Western Australia and in Queensland, Australia.

In the Northern Territory, Voyages operates five venues at Ayers Rock (Uluru) Resort including Sails in the Desert, Desert Gardens Hotel, Emu Walk Apartments, the Outback Pioneer Hotel and Lodge, and the Ayers Rock Campground. In Western Australia, Voyages manages Home Valley Station in the East Kimberley region.

History 
Several resorts were built in and around Yulara during the 1980s. Following a chequered history of the tourism developments in the Northern Territory, the Ayers Rock Resort Company Limited was formed in 1992 and after a period of growth, acquired resorts at Alice Springs and Kings Canyon and established profitability. In September 1997, General Property Trust purchased Ayers Rock Resort Company Limited and changed its name to Voyages Hotels & Resorts in March 2000. A year later, Voyages purchased Odyssey Tours and Safaris, Coconut Beach Rainforest Lodge and Ferntree Rainforest Lodge. Luxury resort, Longitude 131°, was opened in June 2002 under the Voyages banner.

In July 2004, Voyages acquired P&O Australian Resorts, adding properties in Tasmania, Queensland and on the Great Barrier Reef. They then opened Wrotham Park Lodge in September 2004 and acquired El Questro Homestead in July 2005. In early 2006, Voyages sold its Odyssey Tours and Safaris to New South Wales-based Australian Wilderness Tours. Coconut Beach Rainforest Lodge, Ferntree Rainforest Lodge, Jungle Lodge and dive operation Odyssey H2O were also sold a year later.

In July 2009, Cradle Mountain Lodge was sold to the Cradle Mountain Resort Pty. Ltd. Also in July 2009, Silky Oaks Lodge was purchased by Australian-based Gondwana Resorts Pty Ltd. September 2009 saw the sales of Bedarra and Dunk Islands to Hideaway Resorts Pty Ltd. In November 2009, the Lizard Island, Heron Island, Wilson Island and King's Canyon Resort interests were sold to Delaware North. Alice Springs Resort was handed over to Alice Springs Resort Enterprises Pty Ltd. in November and operated as the Chifley Alice Springs Resort.

In 2010, General Property Trust sold Voyages Hotels & Resorts to the Indigenous Land Corporation (ILC) and the ILC formed a new subsidiary, Voyages Indigenous Tourism Australia, to operate the ILC's tourism portfolio. Voyages established a training academy at the Ayres Rock Resort to provide young Indigenous people with accredited training in hospitality and the resort significantly increased its level of Indigenous staff from 1 per cent of the workforce at time of acquisition to approximately 32 per cent of the workforce in 2015.

In 2013, Voyages sold Longitude 131° to Bailey Lodges.

See also

Indigenous Land Corporation

References 

Australian companies established in 2000
Companies based in Sydney
Tourism in the Northern Territory
Organisations serving Indigenous Australians
Tourism organisations in Australia
Travel and holiday companies of Australia